The Bharsaiyan Pathan or Bharaiyan Pathan are a Rajput clan found in the state of Uttar Pradesh in India.

Origin

Bharsaiyan Rajput are found in India and Pakistan. Bharsaiyan are the Rajput clans of Uttar Pradesh. Bharsaiyan clans of Mainpuri Chauhans. A small band of Chauhan warriors are said to have moved to Awadh under the leadership of Karan Singh, who married into a family of Bais Rajputs, who were the dominant power in the region. A descendant of Karan Singh, Baz Singh is said to have converted to Islam during the rule of Sher Shah Suri. His descendants are now found mainly in Inhauna in Sultanpur District. Both the Muslim and Hindu branches of the tribe are confined to Raebareli District. They are said to be the earliest settlers in Sultanpur, having disposed the Bhar and Tiar communities.
The Bharsaiyan are original Rajput clans. The Muslim Bharsaiyan now form a community within the larger Khanzada Pathan ethnic group of eastern Uttar Pradesh. They are Sunni Muslims, Bharsaiyan Rajput are included in Khanzada of Uttar Pradesh and Bharsaiyans are the clans of Chauhans.

See also
 Khanzada

References

Khanzada
Social groups of Uttar Pradesh
Muslim communities of Uttar Pradesh
Muslim communities of India
Rajput clans
Rajput clans of Uttar Pradesh